Vijayakumari is a 1950 Indian Tamil language film directed by A. S. A. Sami. The film stars K. R. Ramasamy and T. R. Rajakumari.

Plot 
This is the story of a young man who works to bring changes in the society destroying corruption and superstitious beliefs. The story is set in a kingdom that had a wily minister. The princess falls in love with the young man, but the minister has ideas to marry the princess to his son. The young man and his sister are tormented by the minister.

Cast 
List adapted from The Hindu article.

Male cast
K. R. Ramasamy as Vijayan
Serukulathur Sama as Prime Minister
T. S. Balaiah as Son of Prime Minister
M. N. Nambiar as the brother of a fisherwoman
R. Balasubramaniam
K. R. Ramsingh as an amputated Wizard
Pulimoottai Ramasami
K. Sayeeram
Female cast
T. R. Rajakumari as the Princess
Kumari Kamala as Sister of Vijayan
P. K. Saraswathi as Maya, Queen of an island
K. S. Angamuthu
M. S. S. Bhagyam as a fisherwoman
Dance
Vyjayanthimala
Lalitha-Padmini

Production 
This is a historical film, but almost like a folklore film, produced by M. Somasundaram under the banner Jupiter Pictures. After the success of Velaikkaari, the producer encouraged A. S. A. Sami to bring out another film with a similar theme. Sami created the character of a young man with revolutionary ideas and the same hero K. R. Ramasamy was featured in the role.

Soundtrack 
Music was composed by C. R. Subburaman and C. S. Jayaraman, while the lyrics were penned by Udumalai Narayana Kavi. The film had 14 songs, some of them of Western style. The dance song Laalu Laalu written by K. D. Santhanam and rendered by A. P. Komala became popular.

As a boy, A. L. Raghavan was introduced by C. S. Jayaraman and sang in a girl's voice for Kumari Kamala in this film.

Reception 
Film historian Randor Guy wrote in 2009 that the film did not do well commercially because of its complicated story.

References

External links 

1950s historical films
Indian historical films
Jupiter Pictures films
Films scored by C. R. Subbaraman